Karen McConnaughay (born March 1, 1957) is an Illinois politician from Kane County. A Republican, she was a member of the Illinois Senate from the 33rd district from 2013 until her resignation in 2018. The 33rd district includes all or parts of Geneva, St. Charles, West Dundee, Hampshire, Huntley, Carpentersville, Lake in the Hills and Algonquin. A resident of St. Charles, she served as the Kane County Board Chairman from 2004 through 2012 prior to her election  to the legislature. Don DeWitte, a former Mayor of St. Charles, Illinois, was appointed by local Republican leaders to succeed her in the Illinois Senate.

On May 4, 2021, Governor J.B. Pritzker appointed McConnaughay to the Illinois State Toll Highway Authority. As of May 27, 2021, her appointment is awaiting confirmation by the Illinois Senate.

During the 2008 Republican Party presidential primaries, McConnaughay ran to be a delegate to the 2008 Republican National Convention from Illinois's 14th congressional district for the presidential campaign of former Governor Mitt Romney.

References

External links
Biography, bills and committees at the 98th Illinois General Assembly
By session: 98th
Senator Karen McConnaughay constituency site
Official campaign website
 
Profile at Ballotpedia

1957 births
Republican Party Illinois state senators
Women state legislators in Illinois
Living people
21st-century American politicians
21st-century American women politicians
People from St. Charles, Illinois
County executives in Illinois